Jester is the surname of:

 Beauford H. Jester (1893–1949), Governor of Texas from 1947–1949
 George Taylor Jester (1847–1922), Lieutenant Governor of Texas from 1895–1899, father of Beauford
 Ralph Jester (1901–1991), American costume designer
 Virgil Jester (born 1927),  former Major League Baseball pitcher
 Simon Jester, an alias of the sentient computer Mike in Robert Heinlein's novel The Moon is a Harsh Mistress